Dysdaemonia is a genus of moths in the family Saturniidae first described by Jacob Hübner in 1819.

Species
Dysdaemonia angustata Breyer, 1933
Dysdaemonia aristor Kirby, 1892
Dysdaemonia auster Felder, 1874
Dysdaemonia australoboreas Brechlin & Meister, 2009
Dysdaemonia boreas (Cramer, 1775)
Dysdaemonia brasiliensis W. Rothschild, 1907
Dysdaemonia concisa Becker & Camargo, 2001
Dysdaemonia cortesi Giacomelli, 1925
Dysdaemonia fasciata John, 1928
Dysdaemonia fosteri W. Rothschild, 1906
Dysdaemonia fusca Breyer, 1933
Dysdaemonia grisea Breyer, 1933
Dysdaemonia jordani Giacomelli, 1925
Dysdaemonia undosa Breyer, 1933
Dysdaemonia undulensis Brechlin & Meister, 2009
Dysdaemonia viridis John, 1928

References

Arsenurinae